Toyota Motor Manufacturing Mississippi (TMMMS) is a Toyota manufacturing facility located in Blue Springs, Mississippi that opened in October 2011. It is a subsidiary of Toyota Motor North America, itself a subsidiary of Toyota Motor Corporation of Japan. The facility currently produces the Toyota Corolla for the North American market. The plant has the capacity to produce 170,000 vehicles per year and employs more than 2,000 people.

History 
Toyota announced on February 27, 2007, that it would build its fourteenth North American plant in Blue Springs, Mississippi. The plan was to employ about 2,000 people to build the Highlander SUV beginning in 2010 at an annual capacity of 150,000 vehicles per year. A groundbreaking ceremony for the facility was held on April 18, 2007.

Construction of the plant was put on hold on December 15, 2008, due to the Great Recession in the United States. Construction resumed on June 17, 2010, and at that time, Toyota announced that the plant would now produce the Toyota Corolla, replacing the NUMMI plant in Fremont, California which closed on April 1, 2010.

The plant began production of the Corolla on October 10, 2011 and the first vehicle rolled off the production line on November 17, 2011. A second shift was added to the plant on February 6, 2012.

The plant built nearly 1.2 million 11th generation Corollas, with the last rolling off the production line on February 22, 2019. The plant spent a few weeks preparing to produce the all-new 12th-generation Corolla, which is built on the new Toyota New Global Architecture platform. The first 12th generation Corolla was completed on March 18, 2019.

Products made 
 Toyota Corolla (2011–present)

References

External links 
Toyota Motor Manufacturing Mississippi at Toyota.com

Industrial buildings completed in 2011
2011 establishments in Mississippi
Toyota factories
Motor vehicle assembly plants in Mississippi
Buildings and structures in Union County, Mississippi